Clarence W. Hackney (March 10, 1894 – January 4, 1941) was a Scottish-American professional golfer.

Early life
Hackney was born in Carnoustie, Scotland. He emigrated to the United States in 1913 and became a U.S. citizen in 1921.

Golf career
Hackney was the head professional at the Atlantic City Country Club from 1914 to 1940. Hackney won seven PGA Tour tournaments between 1923 and 1931, including the 1923 Canadian Open.

Death
Hackney died in Morristown, New Jersey, on January 4, 1941.

Professional wins

PGA Tour wins (7)
1923 (2) Philadelphia Open Championship, Canadian Open
1924 (1) New Jersey State Open
1925 (1) New Jersey State Open 
1926 (1) New Jersey State Open
1930 (1) Philadelphia Open Championship
1931 (1) Philadelphia Open Championship

Other wins
1924 Philadelphia PGA Championship
1928 Philadelphia PGA Championship

See also
List of golfers with most PGA Tour wins

References

Scottish male golfers
American male golfers
PGA Tour golfers
Golfers from New Jersey
Golfers from Carnoustie
Sportspeople from Angus, Scotland
Scottish emigrants to the United States
1894 births
1941 deaths